This is a recap of the 1992 season for the Professional Bowlers Association (PBA) Tour.  It was the tour's 34th season, and consisted of 35 events.

The 1992 season featured 12 first-time winners, including a stretch of five straight weeks in January–February where previous non-winners took home all of the titles.

Eric Forkel, who won his first PBA title earlier in the season, won his second at the Bud Light PBA National Championship. Robert Lawrence was victorious at the BPAA U.S. Open, while PBA President Marc McDowell captured the Firestone Tournament of Champions.

Though he won only two titles on the year and was shut out in majors, Dave Ferraro made numerous TV finals and finished high on the points, average and earnings lists, all of which helped him garner PBA Player of the Year honors.

Jim Pencak, who had gone undefeated in his first 15 career televised matches (a PBA record), ran his streak to 16 in the semi-final of the ABC West Lanes Open before losing in the final match to Bob Vespi.

Tournament schedule

References

External links
1992 Season Schedule

Professional Bowlers Association seasons
1992 in bowling